Mughalsarai (English: Mughal Tavern), officially known as Pandit Deen Dayal Upadhyaya Nagar, is a city and a municipal board in the Chandauli district of Uttar Pradesh. It is the site of the Mughalsarai Junction railway station.

History
Mughalsarai is located along the Grand Trunk Road NH19 (GT ROAD), also called Sadak-e-Azam by Sher Shah Suri, was one of the corridors connecting North India with the east during the Mughal period. In past centuries, it has been variously known as Mughalchak, Mangalpur and Oven Nagar. The township was named Mughalsarai when Indian railways established a junction here in 1883.

Geography
Mughalsarai is bisected by NH 19 / GT Road in three parts. The southern part mainly consists of railway colonies like Vasant Vihar, New Central Colony, Diesel Colony, Haper Colony, European colony, Shubhash Nagar, Loco Colony, and Roza Colony, Plant-Depot Colony and Saresar, Alampur. It starts after the Parao Road in Varanasi and continues until Alinagar Road which comes after Railway Colony on the south. A few mohallas are near the railway station like Qassab Mohal, and Gram Panchayats like Amoghpur, Taranpur, Pashurampur, Dharamshala, Mainatali and Galla Mandi. However, situated on the west side are the Kailashpuri and Ravinagar colonies which compose the poshest area in the city.

Demographics
As of 2011 Indian Census, Mughalsarai had a total population of 109,650, of which 57,682 were males and 51,968 were females. Population within the age group of 0 to 6 years was 14,864. The total number of literates in Mughalsarai was 76,936, which constituted 70.2% of the population with male literacy of 76.0% and female literacy of 63.7%. The effective literacy rate of 7+ population of Mughalsarai was 81.2%, of which male literacy rate was 87.9% and female literacy rate was 73.7%. The Scheduled Castes and Scheduled Tribes population was 17,943 and 2,093 respectively. Mughalsarai had 16,796 households in 2011.

Politics
Mughalsarai (Assembly constituency) represent the area.

Transportation

Railways
The Mughalsarai Junction railway station is the fourth busiest station in India, with about 125 passenger trains passing through it and is well connected in all directions with all major cities and all parts of the country. Mughalsarai now DDU is also known for its Marshal yard which is the biggest in Asia continent.

Notable residents 
 Lal Bahadur Shastri, the second Prime Minister of India was born here.
 Deendayal Upadhyaya, co-founder of the Bharatiya Jana Sangh, was found dead at Mughalsarai in 1968.
 Ramesh Jaiswal, member of 18th Uttar Pradesh Assembly

References

Cities and towns in Chandauli district
Pandit Deen Dayal Upadhyaya Nagar
Caravanserais in India